Lake Jackson Mounds Archaeological State Park (8LE1) is one of the most important archaeological sites in Florida, the capital of chiefdom and ceremonial center of the Fort Walton Culture inhabited from 1050–1500. The complex originally included seven earthwork mounds, a public plaza and numerous individual village residences.

One of several major mound sites in the Florida Panhandle, the park is located in northern Tallahassee, on the south shore of Lake Jackson. The complex has been managed as a Florida State Park since 1966. On May 6, 1971, the site was listed on the U.S. National Register of Historic Places as reference number 71000241.

Fort Walton culture
The site was built and occupied  between 1000 and 1500 by people of the Fort Walton culture, the southernmost expression of the Mississippian culture. The scale of the site and the number and size of the mounds indicate that this was the site of a regional chiefdom, and was thus a political and religious center. After the abandonment of the Lake Jackson site the chiefdom seat was moved to Anhaica (rediscovered in 1987 by B. Calvin Jones and located within DeSoto Site Historic State Park), where in 1539 it was visited by the Hernando de Soto entrada, who knew the residents as the historic Muskogean-speaking Apalachee people. Other related Fort Walton sites are located at Velda Mound (also a park),  Cayson Mound and Village Site and Yon Mound and Village Site.

Site description
The mounds were the result of skilled planning, knowledge of soils and organization of numerous laborers over the period of many years. The ceremonial plaza was a large flat area, constructed and leveled for this purpose, where ritual games and gatherings took place. The area around the mounds and plaza had several areas of heavy village habitation with individual residences, where artisans and workers lived. There were also communal agricultural fields in the surrounding countryside, where the people cultivated maize in the rich local soil, the major reason such a dense population and large site were possible. Only a few of the mounds in the park have been systematically excavated by archaeologists.

The site itself is oriented on an east–west axis, oriented perpendicular to the north–south axis of the Meginnis Arm, a nearby extension of Lake Jackson. All of the mounds are laid out to reflect this alignment, although it is unclear if this is symbolic or merely the result of the lake arm's orientation.

Phases

During the Lake Jackson I phase the site consisted of small village possibly with the beginnings of Mound 2 started. During the Early Lake Jackson II phase
the population and the habitation areas of the site expanded greatly. Many of the areas that would later become mounds were village areas at this time, including the locations of Mounds 3 and 4, as well as areas north of Mounds 2 and 4. Mound 5 was begun and Mound 2 was started during this time. Mounds 3, 4, and 6 were probably not yet started. No evidence exists for occupation in the vicinity of Mound 6. A small area around Mound 5 continued to be occupied during early Lake Jackson II. The areas north of Mound 4 and between Mounds 2 and 4 show evidence of dense occupation during this time. During the Late Lake Jackson II phase, all 7 mounds had been started and most had seen numerous construction episodes. Mound 5 and Mound 6 were possibly finished, and Mounds 2, 3, and 4 were under way but had not had their final stages reached yet. The area to the south and west of Mound 4 and the area between Mounds 2 and 4 continues to be occupied. There is dense occupation north of Mound 2. In the Lake Jackson III phase, the central part of the site is occupied more intensively especially around Mound 2 and spreading north. Mounds 4, 5, and 6 are completed before the beginning of the phase, and Mounds 2 and 3 are finished during the phase. After this point at about 1500, the site is virtually abandoned. There is occasional evidence that the site is still visited in the succeeding Velda phase (1500-1633), but very few artifacts or evidence of habitation from this time period have been found.

Ceramic chronology

Archaeologists use changes in ceramic styles to determine timelines for sites and entire regions. The ceramics found at Lake Jackson have been reconstructed into the following sequences using these ceramic markers.

Mound 2

In the center of the complex is Mound 2, the largest and the best-preserved mound at the site, it measures 36 ft high and 272 ft by 312 ft at the base (11 m × 83 m × 95 m). Like all of the mounds at the site where an original shape can be determined, it is a simple truncated-pyramidal platform mound. Very little excavation has taken place at this mound, so not much is known about the construction sequence or what structures may have been built upon it. There was limited work done on the mound in 1947 by John Griffin, in a salvage cleanup effort of a looters trench. He found a series of fill layers of black muck, various soil types, and caps of red clay, but as the cut was not through the entire mound or located near any structures he could not learn much about its construction sequence or definitive purpose. It was most likely the first mound started at the site, early in Fort Jacksons history. If it is similar to mounds at other sites then it was the house platform of the ruler of the site, who was also possibly a paramount chief over many other sites.

Mound 3

Mound 3 was used as a mortuary mound by its builders. At the end of its construction, it was 5 m in height and 44 by 48 m at the base (16 ft × 144 ft × 157 ft). Based on radiocarbon dating done during excavations, the mound is known to have been constructed between 760 years and 475 years Before Present (based on 1950 as present), or approximately between 1190 and 1475. Below ground level of Mound 3, was a village midden showing residential occupation at this spot before the construction of the mound began. The first activity other than village occupation is a leveling of the location and pit dug and filled with 35 stone projectile points and burned organic material. This is covered over with a layer of clay and structure erected. This building may have been used for feasting rituals. After a period of time this structure was then burned and the first  of mound layer was erected over it. The first burial is included in this layer. The mound was built up in intervals, with new levels being added in stages. The bulk of the mound fill was a mixture of scraped up midden materials. White sand from the lake shore was used as a first layer in each new episode, followed by mound fill and then a red clay from nearby hills was put on in a thin layer as a final cap. The pattern of deposits of fill demonstrated that the earth was intentionally brought to the site, in baskets as individual basket loads could be detected during excavations.

Postholes found on the mound summit indicated that buildings with encircling palisades were erected on the flat top. The last structure erected on the summit measured  and was aligned in a north–south axis just like the mound itself. This rectangular structure is unusual for Apalachee architecture, as most of their structures were round in shape. Archaeologists theorize this may be because of outside influences from other Mississippian centers where rectangular structures are common. The period burning, new fill layer, cap, and structure cycle was repeated twelve times in the 250-year lifespan of the mound. Based on studies at Cahokia (a very large mound center in Illinois) and other Mississippian culture sites, scholars believe that structures were destroyed and the mounds "renewed" with new higher layers of fill and new colored clay caps. The time span in between renewals at many sites suggests the average lifespan of a ruler and their death and replacement by a successor.

The mounds location on private property outside the state owned park meant it was not protected as the mounds inside the park are and it was leveled for use as fill dirt in the winter of 1975–1976. Before it was dug away B. Calvin Jones, an archaeologist with the State of Florida Bureau of Historic Sites and Properties, conducted a salvage operation. He recovered 24 burials from Mound 3, with others known to have been lost in the destruction of the mound. Seven of the twelve levels that had been the top of the mound had graves dug into them. Graves dug into the other levels may have been lost as the mound was destroyed. The burials were in deep pits, some lined with split logs, but each grave was kept track of as none were dug down into previous graves. Before burial the bodies were wrapped in cloth and an embossed copper plate placed on their chest. They were then wrapped in leather and cane matting and placed into the prepared pit graves and split logs placed over them. This entire procedure of wrapping the body is reminiscent of "bundling", a practice used for sacred objects which has a long history among Native North Americans. A selection of other grave goods have been found wrapped in the bundles. In the sequence from lower to higher levels (oldest to more recent), the grave goods became more elaborate. In the upper levels, the grave goods included many objects made of copper, beads made of shell and pearl, and pipes associated with ritual use of tobacco. Although most of the burials were of elite men, the graves included one woman (buried with the most elaborate falcon dancer copper plate) and a child of about eleven years of age, probably of the elite class. One of the bodies had been cremated. The bones of a dog were found on top of one of the clay levels that was an earlier top surface of the mound.

Mounds 1, 4, 5, 6, and 7
Mound 1 was partially excavated in the mid to late 1950s by Charles H. Fairbanks and Hale G. Smith for the Department of Anthropology at Florida State University. All information from the excavation except for a single photo and a partial list of artifacts found are currently missing and presumed lost. Mound 1 is the only mound not currently located within the boundaries of the park and remains privately owned.

Mound 4 was built between 1250 and 1400. It had several more similar construction phases. A series of postholes were discovered at the summit by John Griffin in 1947, but due to time constraints with the work season he could not proceed any further.

Mound 5, the smallest mound at the site, went through at least two phases of mound construction. It was built over a former village area but did not receive a coat of white sand before mound construction as did Mound 4. It seems to have been abandoned sometime during the Late Lake Jackson phase.

Mound 6 was also built on top of an earlier habitation area, and was also given a layer of light-colored sand before the mound was started. Several layers were added over the years and evidence for habitations structures was found on the successive summits. Artifacts found in the mound date to 1250 to 1400, during the Late Lake Jackson II phase.

Mound 7 has never been excavated and has almost nothing known about it. Its seriously degraded shape does not even permit its identification as a platform mound with certainty.

Plazas
The layout and arrangement of the mounds in the central area of the site suggests that there may have been two large plaza areas. Mounds 2, 3, 4, and 5 form a large rectangular shape that was mostly free of debris. Mounds 2, 3, 6, and 7 also form a rectangular shape that suggests it too was a plaza. Both plazas would have had Butler's Mill Creek (a small stream that once bisected these areas, but whose course was altered in historic times) running through it. Excavations have shown that a clean area between Mounds 2 and 4 was a plaza, but not enough work has been done at the rest of the site to confirm the larger dimension suggested by the first arrangement or the existence of a plaza at the second arrangement at all.

Connection to the S.E.C.C.

Artifacts found at the Lake Jackson site include plain and repoussé copper plates, copper headdress badges, engraved shell gorgets, pearl beads, copper axes, and stone and ceramic pipes. Many of these pieces had motifs representative of the Southeastern Ceremonial Complex or SECC. Similar artifacts have been found at the Spiro site in Oklahoma, the Moundville site in Alabama and Etowah Mounds in northwestern Georgia. Stylistic analysis has shown that of the three, Lake Jackson had the closest ties with Etowah. The burials found in Mound 3 were ranked into 3 levels: the elite who were buried with the most-elaborate copper items, pearl beads and shark-teeth-adorned clothing, the middle rank who were interred with stone axes or shell/bead necklaces, and the low-ranked who did not have any high-status grave goods. The iconography of the items also slowly changes with time, growing more complex and numerous and thought by archaeologists to be evidence of influences from other elite polities and the development of a full-fledged local warrior class. At least ten of the burials unearthed at the mound were of "elite war leaders". The most elaborate embossed copper plate found in Mound C greatly resembles the two Rogan plates found in Mound C at the Etowah Site. The three plates are in the Classic Braden style associated with Cahokia, and it is generally thought that the plates were manufactured there before ending up at sites in the Southeast. The Lake Jackson plate depicts a winged dancing figure holding a ceremonial mace in one hand and a severed head in the other. The figure wears an elaborate headdress with an ogee symbol and a bi-lobed arrow motif. Actual copper ogee plates used as headdress were found in burials at Etowah. These motifs are also found on sculptures and shell engravings from the Spiro site, such as the ogee headdress-wearing "Resting Warrior or Big Boy statue". The ogee is usually associated with underworld figures. The figure also appears to be wearing a long-nosed god maskette (an object thought to be associated with ritual adoption and also worn as ear-rings by the Resting Warrior) and clothing which are all motifs associated with the falcon dancer/warrior/chunkey player including the columnella pendant, large shell beads, bellows apron (scalp motif), and the long-waist sash. This plate was one of 14 recovered from the mound, along with 11 copper axes, many copper headdress ornaments, a few polished-stone celts, marine-shell drinking cups of the type historically used for the black drink ritual, and pottery vessels and a few non-local materials such as mica, graphite pigment, red ocher and stone discoidals. All of the copper pieces came to Lake Jackson by way of the Etowah site which shows that the two sites had a long-running relationship, trading their specific local prestige products to each other. The Etowahans prized the whelk shells from the Gulf Coast for the making of shell gorgets and ritual drinking cups and the Lake Jackson elites valued the prestigious Etowah plates and other copper objects. This monopoly on the shell trade by the Etowahans lasted until the fall of the chiefdom in about 1375, after which the elite status goods used in burials in Mound 3 come from other locations, mostly the northern Georgia and eastern Tennessee area.

State park
In May 1966, a T-shaped tract containing  was purchased by the State of Florida and designated the Lake Jackson Mounds State Archaeological Site, to be administered by the then Florida Department of Natural Resources. At the time of this purchase, three-quarters of Mound 2 was in the park, all of Mound 4 was included in the park, and about half of Mound 5, with the remaining other mounds still privately owned. Later more tracts were purchased and as of 2007, only Mound 1 remained outside the boundary of the park. The large park has areas for such activities as trails for hiking and wooden tables for picnicking.

Endangered species
The park is home to an endangered species of plant, the Trillium reliquum. It was discovered by hikers in February 2010. This species was previously thought to inhabit only parts of Alabama, Georgia and South Carolina. The U.S. Fish and Wildlife Service is working to catalog the population.

See also
 Leon-Jefferson culture
 Fort Walton Mound
 List of Mississippian sites

Citations

References

External links 

 Lake Jackson Mounds Archaeological State Park at Florida State Parks
 Leon County listings at National Register of Historic Places
 Leon County listings at Florida's Office of Cultural and Historical Programs
 Lake Jackson Mounds State Archaeological Site at Absolutely Florida
 

State parks of Florida
Parks in Tallahassee, Florida
National Register of Historic Places in Tallahassee, Florida
Protected areas established in 1971
Fort Walton culture
Archaeological sites in Florida
Archaeological parks
Florida Native American Heritage Trail
Mounds in Florida
Archaeological sites on the National Register of Historic Places in Florida
Former populated places in Leon County, Florida
1971 establishments in Florida